The 1998 Toronto Argonauts finished in 3rd place in the East Division of the 1998 CFL season with a 9–9 record and lost the East Division Semi-Finals.

Offseason

CFL draft

Preseason

Regular season

Season standings

Regular season

Postseason

Awards and records

1998 CFL All-Stars
SB – Derrell Mitchell

Eastern Division All-Star Selections
QB – Kerwin Bell
SB – Derrell Mitchell
WR – Paul Masotti
LB – Kelly Wiltshire
CB – Donald Smith
DS – Lester Smith
P – Noel Prefontaine

References

Toronto Argonauts seasons